Qnât, Qanat or Knat (Arabic: قنات) is a municipality in the Bsharri District of Lebanon. The village is located just south of a large cliff and near the towns of Mazraat Bani Saab and Mazraat Assaf. The town is a member of the Federation of Municipalities of Bcharreh District. The name of the town comes from the Syriac word Qno meaning ′to win′, or from the name of the goddess, Anat. Qnat also has a sports club, founded in 1954. The club, headed by Emile Jabbour has won Lebanon's championship multiple times, including in 2020.

Religion 
Qnat is predominately Maronite, with Saint Mary of Qnat church being the main, but not only, church in the town. There are many shrines dedicated to saints in the town, such as the Saint Mema shrine. There is also the Saint Michael convent, the Saint Semaan hermitage, the Saint Antonios Al-Badwani shrine, the Shmouneh Lady shrine, and the Saint Takla Shrine in which a spring is found. There is a large two floor cave and monastery in the south of the town dedicated to Saint Challita. There is also a spring named after Saint Challita which provides water for agriculture and which used to provide drinking water before the main water network was installed. There is also a historic Mar Chayna church which was built in 1800 on the remains of a pagan temple. Bishop Francis Baysari of the Eparchy of Jebbe was born in Qnat. A street that connects the public square to the churches was named after him.

History 

On Tuesday, February 12, 1980, following clashes between the Kateab and the Marada, a Syrian patrol unit entered the town of Qnat and skirmishes then began between the unit and 44 local Phalangist combatants. The patrol unit was helped by Zghortans and the Zghortans helped facilitate their plans. As a result, reinforcements were called in and arrived that night. On the morning of the new day, 11 Lebanese reinforcements also arrived from the Adonis' Defense Units, headed by Hanna Atik, along with 7 elite ″commandos″, led by Suleiman Hoayek. The next day, 9 more Adonis units arrived, and the day after that, in the morning around 5 AM, Syrian forces bombed parts of the town, near the school. This provoked fighting, and after 2 and a half hours, the Syrians retreated and returned to their original positions outside the town, having suffered dozens of casualties while only wounding two members of the Lebanese resistance. During the night of the 15th, 6 troop carries arrived, carrying reinforcements for the Syrians. Near midnight that night, Bob Haddad led a group of Lebanese fighters through the mountains to the town as well.

The following morning, on Saturday, the Lebanese launched a two pronged surprise attack on the Syrians. One group, led by Abou Nader, would attack from Mazraat Bani Saab, and another, led by Samir Geagea, would attack from the town. The attack was effective, with hundreds of Syrians dead and little damage sustained to the Lebanese. On Sunday, February 17, the two parties agreed to a ceasefire, and Lebanese fighters withdrew to Bani Saab and Assaf. That evening, as fighters were attempting to withdraw, one of their fighters, Michel Haddad was killed. Syria then threatened to use aerial attacks, putting helicopters on standby at Hamat Airport. The 3,000 strong Syrian army eventually gained control of the town, but not before most residents had evacuated. The resistance fighters retreated to the town of Niha, which remained a line of conflict throughout the war. In total, an estimated 80 people died. 7 Lebanese fighters, 18 Syrian soldiers and the rest being Qnat civilians, although some sources claim up to 200 were killed and hundreds more wounded. Several thousand civilians were also displaced during the battle and stranded in the cold weather and snow. The battle turned Geagea, the son of a modest family, into a respected leader and a member of Maronite community’s new elite. When describing this battle, Sheikh Bachir Gemayel said: "The Battle of Qnat paralleled the Hundred Days’ War in Achrafieh".

References

Populated places in the North Governorate
Bsharri District